Bhattedanda  is a village and former Village Development Committee that is now part of Bagmati Rural Municipality in Province No. 3 of central Nepal. At the time of the 1991 Nepal census it had a population of 2,044 in 349 individual households.

On 28 September 1992, Pakistan International Airlines Flight 268 crashed in Bhattedanda, killing all 167 people on board.

References

External links
UN map of the municipalities of Lalitpur District

Populated places in Lalitpur District, Nepal